The Joe McDonagh Cup is an annual inter-county hurling competition organised by the Gaelic Athletic Association (GAA). It forms the second tier of the All-Ireland Senior Hurling Championship and is the second highest level of inter-county championship hurling competition in Ireland. The last of the five tiers to be established, the competition was contested for the first time in 2018.

Creation and history

At the GAA’s Special Congress on 30 September 2017, a new provincial hurling championship system featuring five-team round-robin groups in both Leinster and Munster was accepted. This restructure necessitated the removal of four counties from the Leinster Championship. These four teams joined the 2017 Christy Ring Cup finalists - Antrim and Carlow - in creating the new Tier 2 Championship. The proposal was carried by a narrow margin with 62% voting in favour (a majority of at least 60% was required).	

An amendment to the motion from Laois, Offaly and Meath was carried by 87%. This would see the two Joe McDonagh Cup finalists participating in preliminary All-Ireland quarter-finals against the third-placed team in both Leinster and Munster with the Joe McDonagh Cup teams having home advantage.

Format

The McDonagh Cup employs a round-robin system, contested within a single group of 6 county teams. At the completion of the round-robin, the top two teams proceed to contest the Joe McDonagh Cup final.

Aside from the trophy itself, the reward for victory in the competition depends on the provincial allegiance of the winner; if the winner is a Munster team, it will enter a promotion/relegation playoff with the bottom team in that year's Munster Senior Hurling Championship, with the winner entering the following years Munster Championship, and the loser returning to the following year's edition of the Joe McDonagh Cup. If the winner is not a Munster team, they are automatically promoted to the following year's Leinster Senior Hurling Championship, with their place in the following year's Joe Mcdonagh Cup taken by the bottom-placed team in that year's Leinster Championship.

The Joe McDonagh Cup is unique among the four lower-tier hurling competitions in that it also provides a direct entry route for the top two teams to compete in that year's All-Ireland Senior Hurling Championship. The top two-placed teams after the group stage, in addition to contesting the Cup final and a possible Munster Championship promotion playoff for the winner, are both rewarded with entry into the GAA Hurling All-Ireland Senior Championship at the preliminary quarter-final stage.

The bottom two teams in the group stage contests a relegation playoff with the loser relegated to the third-tier Christy Ring Cup for the following year, being replaced by the champions of the Christy Ring Cup for that year. Since 2018 there has been no promotion/relegation playoff between tiers two and three.

Teams

2023 Cup 
Six counties will compete in the 2023 Joe McDonagh Cup, with Laois relegated from the Leinster Senior Hurling Championship and Kildare promoted from the Christy Ring Cup:

Seasons in Joe McDonagh Cup 
The number of years that each county has played in the Joe McDonagh Cup between 2018 and 2023. A total of 9 counties have competed in at least one season of the Joe McDonagh Cup. Kerry have participated in all 6 seasons. The counties in bold participate in the 2023 Joe McDonagh Cup.

Debut of teams

List of Joe McDonagh Cup Counties

Comprehensive team results by tournament 
9 county teams have participated in at least one edition of the McDonagh Cup. Kerry have been ever-presents in the first five editions. Down and Kildare have qualified for the 2021 edition so teams participated in the Joe McDonagh Cup will increase to 9. Offaly hold the dubious distinction of being the only team to be relegated to hurling's third-tier, having previously been relegated from the tier-one Leinster championship, in successive seasons.

 Legend

  – Champions
  – Runners-up
  – Group Stage
  – Relegated
 L – Leinster Senior Hurling Championship
 CR – Christy Ring Cup

For each tournament, the number of teams in each finals tournament (in brackets) are shown.

Venues

Group stage

Fixtures in the five group stage rounds of the cup are played at the home ground of one of the two teams. Each team is guaranteed at least two home games. During the inaugural staging of the competition some teams had three home games.

Final

The Joe McDonagh Cup final is played at Croke Park as the curtain-raiser to the Leinster final on the first Sunday in July.

Trophy and medals

At the end of the cup final, the winning team are presented with a trophy. The Joe McDonagh Cup is held by the winning team until the following year's final. The presentation is made at a special rostrum in the Ard Chomairle section of the Hogan Stand where GAA and political dignitaries and special guests view the match.

The cup is decorated with ribbons in the colours of the winning team. During the game the cup has both teams' sets of ribbons attached and the runners-up ribbons are removed before the presentation. The winning captain accepts the cup on behalf of his team before giving a short speech. Individual members of the winning team then have an opportunity to come to the rostrum to lift the cup.

The cup is named after Joe McDonagh. He was an All-Ireland medal winner with Galway in 1980 before later serving as President of the Gaelic Athletic Association. McDonagh, who died in May 2016, was one of the most respected figures within the GAA.

The winning team is presented with a set of gold medals.

List of Finals

Team records and statistics

Performance by county

Performance by province

All time table 
Legend

As of 4 June 2022. Includes Relegation Playoffs.

Player records

Top scorers

All time

By year

In a single game

In finals

Captains

All-Ireland Record

All-Ireland Senior Hurling Championship

See also
All-Ireland Senior Hurling Championship (Tier 1)
Christy Ring Cup (Tier 3)
Nicky Rackard Cup (Tier 4)
Lory Meagher Cup (Tier 5)

References

 
2018 establishments in Ireland
All-Ireland inter-county hurling championships
Hurling cup competitions
Recurring sporting events established in 2018